Kotkas is an Estonian surname meaning "eagle". Notable people with the surname include:

 Johannes Kotkas (1915–1998), Estonian wrestler
 Kalev Kotkas (born 1960), Estonian politician
 Kalevi Kotkas (1913–1983), Estonian-born Finnish athlete

Estonian-language surnames
Surnames from nicknames